The Men's Downhill in the 2019 FIS Alpine Skiing World Cup involved eight events. Swiss skier Beat Feuz won his second consecutive season title in this discipline.

The season was interrupted by the 2019 World Ski Championships, which were held from 4–17 February in Åre, Sweden. The men's downhill was held on 9 February.

Standings

DNF = Did Not Finish
DNS = Did Not Start

See also
 2019 Alpine Skiing World Cup – Men's summary rankings
 2019 Alpine Skiing World Cup – Men's Overall
 2019 Alpine Skiing World Cup – Men's Super-G
 2019 Alpine Skiing World Cup – Men's Giant Slalom
 2019 Alpine Skiing World Cup – Men's Slalom
 2019 Alpine Skiing World Cup – Men's Combined
 World Cup scoring system

References

External links
 Alpine Skiing at FIS website

External links
 

Men's Downhill
FIS Alpine Ski World Cup men's downhill discipline titles